The Yichang Yangtze River Highway Bridge is a suspension bridge that crosses the Yangtze River some 20 km downstream from the center city of Yichang, China. It is located within the prefecture-level city of Yichang, and carries the G50 Shanghai–Chongqing Expressway.

The construction of the bridge started on 19 February 1998., and it was open for traffic on 19 September 2001.

, it is among the 30 longest suspension bridges, based on the length of the main span.

The cost of building the bridge was reported as 895 million yuan.

See also
 List of longest suspension bridge spans
 List of bridges in China
 Yangtze River bridges and tunnels

References

External links

 
 Photos and location from Google Earth

Suspension bridges in China
Bridges over the Yangtze River
Bridges completed in 2001
Yichang
Bridges in Hubei